The Honda Silver Wing is a  maxi-scooter designed and manufactured by Honda Motor Co., Ltd.

Introduced in 2001, it has a continuously variable transmission. Anti-lock brakes are optional.

The name Silver Wing was previously used for an earlier Honda motorcycle series including the GL500 and GL650.

References

External links
2013 Model information at official Honda web site

Silver Wing
Maxi scooters
Motorcycles introduced in 2001
Motorcycles powered by straight-twin engines